The Missouri Valley Conference women's basketball tournament, currently promoted as Hoops in the Heartland, is an annual basketball tournament which features the women's basketball teams of each of the Missouri Valley Conference member universities.  The tournament determines which MVC team receives an automatic bid to the NCAA Women's Division I Basketball Tournament.

First held at the end of the 1982–83 basketball season, the tournament was originally conducted by the Gateway Collegiate Athletic Conference, a women's sports conference formed in that school year by six MVC members plus four members of what is now known as the Summit League. In 1985, the Gateway took on football as its only men's sport. Following the 1991–92 school year, the MVC absorbed the women's side of the Gateway (which by that time had eight MVC members) and spun off its football side into what is now the Missouri Valley Football Conference. The MVC maintains all historic records of Gateway women's sports.

Tournament champions by year

Tournament championships by school

†Former member of the MVC

See also
 Missouri Valley Conference men's basketball tournament

References